375 Hudson Street is an 18-story office building located in the West Village, New York City.
Commissioned and managed by Hudson Square Properties, 375 Hudson St. was built between 1987 and 1989. It was constructed with steel, and the building's main purpose is to hold office spaces. The office building holds over 1.12 million square feet across 18-floors and is the first LEED Gold certified for environmentally conscious building in New York City.

Architects 
The building was a collaboration between Emery Roth & Sons, Lee Harris Pomeroy Associates and Skidmore, Owings & Merrill. Emery Roth & Sons has built many high-rise and office buildings. Lee Harris Pomeroy Associates is lesser known for its creative works and more for its restoration projects on buildings including the Plaza Hotel, Grand Central Terminal, and multiple subway stops. Its involvement in this project included creating the layouts to fit a computer, word processing, and satellite access. Skidmore, Owings & Merrill work mostly on modern buildings, and more recently, have worked in the Hudson Yards Development.

Art Installations 

In an effort to instill hope during the pandemic, an art installation that would be viewable from the street was put on display on the mezzanine. Created by Artist Gera Lozano, the artwork consists of murals that are affixed to the round windows of the building's ground floor. The artist wanted to capture the essence of New York in the murals. This mural is part of an effort to create communal spaces in the area; in addition to artworks the neighboring buildings on Hudson and King Street are creating interactive displays to revitalize and beautify the environment around the building to encourage pedestrians to interact with their environment.

History 
The recorded history of the land that 375 Hudson Street sits on goes back 300 years to Queen Anne, who gifted the land to the Church in 1705. Today, Trinity Church still owns 14 acres of the West Village. In 2015, Trinity Church created a partnership with Norges Bank Investment Management to maintain the 11 office buildings on the land. In addition, Hines, a real estate investment company, was added to the partnership in 2016. Currently, the group aims to create spaces in the neighborhood for creative companies and renovate buildings to meet high sustainability standards. Originally in the 1920s, the neighborhood was home to many printing companies; this was largely due to New York becoming the printing capital of the country and the close proximity to the construction of the Holland Tunnel. Once the printing demand went down, advertising companies began to take the spaces left behind, and new offices were created.

Management 
The building is managed by both The Trinity Church Wall Street and Norges Bank Investment Management. The Norges Bank is funded by revenue from Norway's oil and gas resources. Its goal is to support  wealth growth and security for current and future generations. In addition the building is also managed by Hines, one of the largest real estate investment companies in the world.

Tenants 
The first tenant was advertising company Saatchi & Saatchi, part of one of the world's largest communications groups. In addition, Penguin Group has also been a tenant in the building. More recently, the French Publicis company, which is the company that owns Saatchi & Saatchi has decided to expand its lease of the building to encompass 280,000 more feet across the building.

LEED Certification 
In 2010 the building was the first to receive the LEED Gold certification in New York City. The building was able to achieve this by changing the HVAC system to allow for energy-efficient technologies including variable-frequency drives on the cooling fans and improved heat exchangers. In addition, to lessen water usage, the entire building was outfitted with water-saving fixtures, this alone saved 1 million gallons of water. Other eco-friendly methods included recycling services for paper, plastics, electronics, and construction debris and using environmentally conscious cleaners.

References 

Buildings and structures in Manhattan
Leadership in Energy and Environmental Design gold certified buildings